Levenhookia pauciflora, the deceptive stylewort, is a dicotyledonous plant that belongs to the genus Levenhookia (family Stylidiaceae). Flowers are white and bloom from September to November in its native range. L. pauciflora is endemic to Western Australia where it grows in sandy soils in sandstone or granitic areas. The flowers of L. pauciflora resemble those of Stylidium ecorne and it has been said that S. ecorne mimics L. pauciflora to take advantage of its pollinators.

Taxonomy
The specific epithet pauciflora, describes the plant as 'few flowered' (in Botanical Latin).

References

Endemic flora of Western Australia
Eudicots of Western Australia
pauciflora
Plants described in 1837